Reuben David Egan (March 20, 1954 – March 18, 2016) was an American singer, songwriter, and pianist based in Lafayette, Louisiana, who composed, recorded, and performed rock, Cajun-rock, soul, and blues.  Egan died March 18, 2016, at his home from cancer.

Selected discography

As composer, arranger, and performer
 "Underground Stream," by David Egan
 Album: Irma Thomas, Simply Grand, Rounder Records (2008); 
 Irma Thomas, vocals; David Egan, piano

 "One Foot In The Bayou," by David Egan
 Album: Tab Benoit, Power of the Pontchartrain, Telarc (2007); 
 Album: Filé, La Vie Marron, Green Linnet (1996); 
 David Egan, vocals and piano

 "Good To You Baby," by David Egan and Buddy Flett (né Bruce Mechlin Flett; born 1951)
 Album: Tab Benoit, Power of the Pontchartrain, Telarc (2007); 

 "If You Knew How Much," by David Egan
 "Stone Survivor," by David Egan
 "These Honey-Do's," by Irma Thomas and David Egan
 Album: Irma Thomas, After the Rain, Rounder Records (2007); 

 "Peace, Love and BBQ," by David Egan, Tony Braunagel, and John Lee Schell
 Album: Marcia Ball, Peace, Love and BBQ, Alligator Records (2008); 

 "Fading Footsteps" by David Egan
 Album: Solomon Burke, Make Do with What You Got, Shout Factory (2005); 

 "Please No More," by David Egan and Greg Hansen
 Album: Etta James, Let’s Roll, Private Music (2003); 
 Album: Sing It, Rounder Records (1988); 
 Performed by Marcia Ball, Irma Thomas and Tracy Nelson
 Album: Joe Cocker, Night Calls, Capitol Records (1992); 
 Album: Terry Evans, Come To The River, AudioQuest Music (1997); 

 "French Café," by David Egan
 "Gotta Be More," by Marc Broussard, David Egan, and Marshall Altman
 "Momentary Setback," by Marc Broussard and David Egan
 Debut Album: Marc Broussard, Momentary Setback, Ripley Records (2002); 

 "First You Cry," by David Egan and Buddy Flett (né Bruce Mechlin Flett; born 1951)
 Album: Percy Sledge, Blue Night, Point Blank Records (1994); 
 Album: Lil’ Band O’ Gold, Shanachie Records (2000); 
 Performed by Lil’ Band O’ Gold (David Egan, vocals and keyboards)
 Album: Maura O'Connell, Blue Is The Color Of Hope, Warner Bros. Records (1992); 

 "Wake Up Call," by David Egan and David Love Lewis (born 1946)
 Album: Performed by John Mayall and Mavis Staples on the Wake Up Call, Silvertone (1993); 
 Album Jimmy Witherspoon, The Blues, The Whole Blues, And Nothing But The Blues, Indigo (1992); 
 Produced by Mike Vernon

 "Sing It," by David Egan
 Album: Marcia Ball, Irma Thomas and Tracy Nelson, Sing It, Rounder Records (1998); 

 "People Will Be People," by David Egan
 Album: Marcia Ball, Irma Thomas and Tracy Nelson Sing It, Rounder Records (1998); 
 Album: The Fabulous Thunderbirds, Live, Sanctuary Records Group (2001); 

 "Even Now," by David Egan and Buddy Flett (né Bruce Mechlin Flett; born 1951)
 Album: Johnny Adams, Man Of My Word, Rounder Records (1998); 

 "Too Much Wine," by David Egan
 "Can’t Get Nothin’ Sucka," by David Egan and Nathan Williams
 Album: Nathan and the Zydeco Cha-Chas, Let’s Go, Rounder Records (2000); 

 "When I Was A Dinosaur," by David Egan and Larry Armer (né John Larry Armer; born 1949)
 Album: Trout Fishing in America, Big Trouble, Trout Records (1991); 
 Album:  Dr. Demento's 25th Anniversary Collection:  More of the Greatest Novelty Records of All Time, Rhino Records (1995); 
 Album: Bill Mumy and Robert Haimer, The Dinosaur Album: A Musical Adventure Through The Jurassic Age, Kid Rhino (1993); 
 Album: Chenille Sisters, 1-2-3 For Kids, Red House Records (1989);

Bands
 Filé
 A Train

References

External links
David Egan official website

1954 births
2016 deaths
American male singer-songwriters
American rock singers
American rock songwriters
University of North Texas College of Music alumni
Musicians from Shreveport, Louisiana
Musicians from Lafayette, Louisiana
Deaths from cancer in Louisiana
Singer-songwriters from Louisiana